Dundee Wanderers Football Club was a football club based in Dundee, Scotland. They were formed in 1894 as a result of a merger between two local clubs, Wanderers and Strathmore. The club was briefly a member of the Scottish Football League (SFL), playing in Division Two during the 1894–95 season, but after finishing second from bottom of the league they failed re-election. In December 1894 the suffered an all-time record SFL defeat, losing 15–1 to Airdrieonians. Their home ground was Clepington Park (now Tannadice Park, the home of Dundee United).

History
Wanderers were formed in 1885 as a breakaway from Dundee Our Boys (which eight years later merged with Dundee East End to form Dundee F.C.). In 1894 Wanderers merged with another city club, Strathmore, to form Dundonians, in order to apply for membership of the Scottish Football League. They were successful, but as Dundee F.C. had objected to their name, Dundonians became Dundee Wanderers in June 1894. They spent the 1894–95 season as members of the Second Division, finishing ninth out of ten. Their performance might well have been worse had they not been awarded two points after Renton failed to fulfil a fixture against the club, with the Dunbartonshire side instead opting for a glamour friendly against Queen's Park. Wanderers' brief sojourn in the Scottish League did produce one record that still stands, however, with the club's 15–1 away defeat to Airdrieonians remaining the heaviest defeat in Scottish League history.

The club lost the tenancy of Clepington Park during the summer of 1894, as a consequence of which they played the first half of their one season as a League club at East Dock Street. In December they returned to Clepington Park, but failed to secure re-election to the Scottish League for season 1895–96 and went on to join the Northern League.

They became Northern League champions in 1900, but lost the tenancy of Clepington Park again in 1909 to the newly formed Dundee Hibernian (later Dundee United). Rendered homeless, Wanderers had to play all of their matches on the grounds of their opponents the following season and, still unable to find a ground, were forced to resign from the Northern League at the end of it, playing only cup ties and friendly matches during 1910–11. Having secured the tenancy of St Margaret's Park in Lochee, the club re-joined the Northern League for season 1911–12 but their demise was approaching.

The final national competitive match played by Dundee Wanderers was a Scottish Cup tie at Arbroath on 7 September 1912, which they lost 8–0. The only record of the club taking the field again was for a Forfarshire Cup semi-final tie at Dens Park, Dundee (against Dundee 'A') on 15 March 1913. Wanderers had received a bye into the semi-final, but lost by six goals to one and the club was formally wound up at the end of that season.

Stadium
Wanderers/Johnstone Wanderers – 1885–1891 Morgan Park. 1891–1894 Clepington Park.

Strathmore – 1880–1892 Rollo's Pier/Logie Park. 1892–1894 Carolina Park.

Dundee Wanderers – 1894 East Dock Street Ground. 1894–1909 Clepington Park. 1909–1910 No Ground. 1910–1913 St Margaret's Park, Lochee.

Colours 
Wanderers/Johnstone Wanderers – 1885–1894 Maroon shirts with dark blue sash (diagonal stripe), dark blue shorts.

Dundee Wanderers – 1894–1900 Red & white striped shirts, dark blue shorts. 1900–1913 Red shirts, black shorts.

Honours 

As Dundee Wanderers.
 Northern League 
 1899–1900

 Forfarshire Cup 
 1897–98, 1901–02

 Dewar Shield
 1903–04

As Wanderers.
 Burns Charity Cup
 1886–87, 1887–88

 Dundee Charity Cup
 1893–94

 Storrie Cup
 1887–88

References

External links
Club history and kits

 
Defunct football clubs in Scotland
Association football clubs established in 1894
Association football clubs disestablished in 1913
Football clubs in Dundee
Scottish Football League teams
1894 establishments in Scotland
1913 disestablishments in Scotland